The 1992 All-Ireland Senior Camogie Championship was the high point of the 1992 season. The championship was won by Cork, who defeated Wexford by a 14-point margin in the final for their third successive success. The match drew an attendance of 4,000.

Semi-finals
All-Ireland semi-finalists in 1933, Kildare re-entered the senior championships and were beaten in the quarter final by Galway, 9-14 to 3-4 after an evenly contested first half at Clane, Sharon Glynn scoring 4-5 of their total. Kilkenny had a huge 9-20 to 0-5 win over Clare on July 12. Two well-taken goals by Colette Mahony gave Cork a victory over Kilkenny in the semi-final while Ann Reddy and Ann Marie O'Connor gave Wexford their two goals in victory over Galway.

Final
Fiona O'Driscoll got the only goal of the final in the 24th minute and Cork had little to worry about as they led by four points at half time and won by eleven. Desmond Fahy’s evocative intro to the Irish Times report of the final read
One week on, Clonllffe Road was eerily quiet before yesterday’s ALL-Ireland senior camogie final between Cork and Wexford. Some optimistic hawkers were taking advantage of the last opportunity of the year to sell some colours. This, however, is not to detract from what went on inside Croke Park. Cork and Wexford served up an entertaining and, at times, highly skilled final, that deserved a better crowd.

Final stages

Match rules
50 minutes
Replay if scores level
Maximum of 3 substitutions

See also
 All-Ireland Senior Hurling Championship
 Wikipedia List of Camogie players
 National Camogie League
 Camogie All Stars Awards
 Ashbourne Cup

References

External links
 Camogie Association
 All-Ireland Senior Camogie Championship: Roll of Honour
 Camogie on facebook
 Camogie on GAA Oral History Project

1992 in camogie
1992